Featherstone Rovers are an English rugby league club. Everyone who played for the club between 1921 and 2016 has been allocated a sequential heritage number by the club, in order of their appearance. The list comprise 1,051 players.

List of players
  
 
 ^¹ = Played For Featherstone Rovers During More Than One Period
 ^² = Prior to the 1974–75 season all goals, whether; conversions, penalties, or drop-goals, scored two points, consequently prior to this date drop-goals were often not explicitly documented, and "0 ²" indicates that drop-goals may not have been recorded, rather than no drop-goals scored. In addition, prior to the 1949–50 season, the Field-goal was also still a valid means of scoring points. 
 BBC = BBC2 Floodlit Trophy 
 CC = Challenge Cup 
 CF = Championship Final 
 CM = Captain Morgan Trophy 
 RT = League Cup, i.e. Player's № 6, John Player (Special), Regal Trophy 
 YC = Yorkshire County Cup 
 YL = Yorkshire League

References 
 
 
 
 

 
Featherstone